Sharon Lynch (born 17 September 1982) is an Irish female rugby union player. She represented  at the 2014 Women's Rugby World Cup. She first played rugby in 2008, after moving to Dublin for work.

Lynch is a real estate agent. She is an associate director at Savills.

References

External links
Irish Rugby Player Profile

1982 births
Living people
Irish female rugby union players
Ireland women's international rugby union players
Old Belvedere R.F.C. players
Rugby union players from County Kerry